The Ciudad Encantada (English: Enchanted City) is a geological site near the city of Cuenca, in the autonomous community of Castilla–La Mancha, Spain in which the erosive forces of weather and the waters of the nearby Júcar river have formed rocks into distinctive and memorable shapes.

It was declared a Natural Site of National Interest on 11 June 1929.

Origin of the formations
The rock formations of Ciudad Encantada are karst formations made of limestone and dolomite, which date back to the Cretaceous period, approximately 90 million years ago. Rain falling on the original limestone plateau wore down the porous limestone, leaving behind the more resistant dolomite. Because the dolomite was not always distributed evenly in the original rock, the result was the irregularly eroded shapes that form the Ciudad Encantada.

Shapes of rocks
The rock formations that have been named include:

In film and television
Ciudad Encantada appears as a location in the following films:

 The Pride and the Passion, 1957
 The Colossus of Rhodes, 1962
 The Mercenary, 1968.
 Johnny Hamlet, 1968.
 The Valley of Gwangi, 1969.
 Conan the Barbarian, 1982.
 The World is not enough, 1999.

Gallery

References

External links

 Visitor information from the Ayuntamiento de Cuenca
 Images of some of the more distinctive rock formations
 Web Ciudad Encantada Cuenca

Landforms of Castilla–La Mancha
Rock formations of Spain
Tourist attractions in Castilla–La Mancha